King Billy may refer to:

People

Australia
 Jimmy Clements (1847–1927), Wiradjuri elder, also known as "King Billy"
 King Billy of Armidale, NSW, aka King Bobby, Aboriginal leader, grandfather of Frank Archibald, in honour of whom the Frank Archibald Memorial Lecture Series was named
 King Billy of Bonny Doon Lorne, Bidjara elder and great-great-grandfather of Christian Thompson (artist), honoured by his 2010 work King Billy
 King Billy Cokebottle ( 1949–2019), white Australian comedian who wore blackface
 Willem Baa Nip (1836–1885), also known as King Billy, William Gore or Billy Wa-wha, was a member of the Wathaurung people
 William Lanne (c. 1835–1869), last surviving male of the Aboriginal Tasmanian Oyster Cove clan, known as King Billy

United Kingdom
 Billy Bremner (1942-1997), Scottish footballer, often referred to as "King Billy" by supporters
 William III of England (1650–1702), informally known in Northern Ireland and Scotland as "King Billy"

Other
 King Billy Pine, a species of Athrotaxis
 King Billy of Ballarat and Other Stories (1892), a series of short stories by Morley Roberts

See also

 Billy King (disambiguation)
 King William (disambiguation)